Andra Martin (born Sandra Rehn, July 15, 1935 – May 3, 2022) was an American actress who appeared in many television series and a few movies as a contract player for Warner Bros. in the late 1950s and early 1960s.

Early years
Martin was born Sandra Rehn, the daughter of Mr. and Mrs. Herbert Walter Rehn. She grew up near Rockford, Illinois, on her parents' farm, graduated from Monroe Center High School and studied dramatics for two years at Northwestern University. From there, she went to New York and worked as a model while she studied acting under Lee Strasberg. She honed her acting skills in the summer playhouse at Eagles Mere, Pennsylvania.

Career
Martin's film debut came in Street of Sinners (1957). The Lady Takes a Flyer (1958) was the first film in which she was billed as Andra Martin. In 1958, she appeared in the horror film The Thing That Couldn't Die, about a 400-year-old head that uses telepathic control of various people to help him find his body. In 1958 she won the Hollywood Debut Award. 

Martin was James Garner's leading lady in the 1959 film Up Periscope, and the daughter/secretary on the Perry Mason TV-series episode "The Case of the Prodigal Parent." She also played the role of defendant Arlene Ferris in the 1961 episode, "The Case of the Waylaid Wolf."

Martin played Wahleeah, a captive American Indian maiden who became the love interest of Clint Walker in Yellowstone Kelly (1959) and appeared in various television series, including Maverick in the episodes "Gun-Shy" with James Garner as Bret Maverick, "Hadley's Hunters" with Jack Kelly as Bart Maverick, and "Thunder from the North" (1960) with Roger Moore as Beau Maverick.  She also guest starred as a leading lady in series such as The Alaskans with Roger Moore, 77 Sunset Strip with Efrem Zimbalist Jr., Colt .45 with Wayde Preston, Bourbon Street Beat, Hawaiian Eye with Robert Conrad, Surfside Six, Bronco with Ty Hardin, Lawman with John Russell, Cheyenne with Clint Walker, Bachelor Father with John Forsythe, and Wagon Train, among others.

Personal life
Politically Martin identified as a "Conservative Republican." She stated that she voted for Eisenhower in the 1956 United States presidential election, which was the first time she had ever voted, and that she voted for Barry Goldwater in the 1964 United States presidential election. In both the 1968 United States presidential election and the 1972 United States presidential election she campaigned for Richard Nixon. She said the only time she ever voted for a Democrat was in 1960 when she voted for John F. Kennedy.

On August 30, 1958, Martin married actor Ty Hardin in North Hollywood, California, despite the objections of Warner Bros. studios, for which they both worked. They were the parents of twin sons born in 1959.

On June 23, 1962, she married David May II, heir to a chain of department stores. They were divorced in 1968. Martin died on May 3, 2022, at the age of 86. When she died, she was married to Philip Stein, whom she wed in 1970.

References

External links
 

1935 births
2022 deaths
21st-century American women
American television actresses
American film actresses
Actors from Rockford, Illinois
Warner Bros. contract players